Tío Pepe (in Spanish, "Uncle Pepe", named after one of the founders' uncles) is a brand of Sherry.  It is best known for its fino style of dry sherry made from the palomino grape. The Tío Pepe brand is owned by the González Byass Sherry house.

Tío Pepe 
Tío Pepe has based its recent success on promoting itself as a very dry white wine to be served with food, in doing so aiming to differentiate itself from poor quality sherries and their downmarket reputation. The Tío Pepe soleras were established in 1844 and have run uninterrupted since that time.

Cultural References
In Len Deighton’s novel The Ipcress File (1962), the protagonist, (called Harry Palmer in the film and TV series), drinks Tio Pepe at one of his meetings with his boss Ross.

References

External links
 Tío Pepe official site

Jerez de la Frontera
Sherry
Winemaker of the year awards
Wineries of Spain